Ballymalis Castle is a tower house and National Monument located in County Kerry, Ireland.

Location

The Ring of Kerry runs to the north.

History

This castle was built in the early 16th century by the Ó Muircheartaigh (O'Moriartys). It later passed to the Ó Fearghuis (Ferrises), who renovated it in the late 16th century. In 1677 the manor was confiscated by the Crown and granted to Sir Francis Brewster, who granted it to the Eager (Eagar) family.

Building
This is a tower house, partially restored. It is rectangular, with four storeys and an attic, with bartizans in the southwest and northeast corners. Also featured are slopstones, a machicolation, chimneys, fireplaces and decorated windows with mullions and transoms. Some of the alure (wall-walk) survives.

References

National Monuments in County Kerry
Castles in County Kerry